Anatoliy Ivanovich Tischenko is a Soviet sprint canoer who competed in the early 1970s. He won three medals at the ICF Canoe Sprint World Championships with two golds (K-1 500 m and K-1 4 x 500 m: both 1970) and a bronze (K-1 4 x 500 m: 1971).

References

Living people
Soviet male canoeists
Year of birth missing (living people)
Russian male canoeists
ICF Canoe Sprint World Championships medalists in kayak
Honoured Coaches of Russia
Honoured Masters of Sport of the USSR
Recipients of the Order of Friendship of Peoples